Partridge Lake is a lake in the Great Lakes Basin in Addington Highlands, Lennox and Addington County, Ontario, Canada.

The primary inflow is Partridge Creek at the southwest. There are also two unnamed creek secondary inflows at the north and east. Partridge Creek is also the primary outflow at the southeast of the lake. The creek flows via the Skootamatta River and Moira River to the Bay of Quinte on Lake Ontario at Belleville.

See also
List of lakes in Ontario

References

Lakes of Lennox and Addington County